Anna Blinkova and Xenia Knoll were the defending champions but chose not to participate.

Samantha Murray Sharan and Julia Wachaczyk won the title, defeating Paula Kania and Katarzyna Piter in the final, 7–5, 6–2.

Seeds

Draw

Draw

References
Main Draw

Open de Cagnes-sur-Mer - Doubles